Katharsis is the eleventh album by British heavy metal band Praying Mantis, released in 2022. A music video was produced for the album's opener, "Cry For The Nations" as well as "Closer To Heaven."

Reception

Reception has been "generally positive" after its release. Rock Hard gave it a solid rating, labeling it as "nicely arranged, 'fluffy' hard rock." Positively, a review from Metal1 stated in their review that while it might not be the strongest album in their career, "Katharsis is definitely a well-made, multi-layered and, above all, extremely high-quality rock record of the British style." A more critical review from Metal.de stated how Praying Mantis delivers solid melodic AOR, and that the troupe knows how to make stadium rock and avoid breakaways. However, they added that the record doesn't contain any big hits and has no real long-term standing effect. "People who tend towards Hard Rock or NWoBHM shouldn't be happy with this disc. Fans of melodic stadium rock should try the work, but don't expect any major highlights." Blabbermouth spoke well of the album, and showed appreciation towards tracks such as "Cry For The Nations," "Sacrifice," "Wheels In Motion," and "Don't Call Us Now" which they stated as "an infectious pop-rock shuffle, with the album's strongest chorus and faint echoes of rock opera and Jethro Tull." Moreover, they criticized songs like "Ain't No Rock 'N' Roll In Heaven" and "Long Time Coming" for being straightforward and prosaic in that they pale in comparison with the album's deeper cuts. Concluding with that, at its best, "Katharsis tells of a veteran band with plenty of gas in the tank and a strong grip on their highly distinctive identity."

Tracklist

Personnel
Band
 John Cuijpers - vocals
 Andy Burgess – guitar, backing vocals, keyboards
 Tino "Daddy Long Legs" Troy – guitar, backing vocals, keyboards
 Chris "The Dak" Troy – bass, backing vocals, keyboards
 Hans In't Zandt – drums, backing vocals, percussion 
Miscellaneous staff
 Rainer Kalwitz – artwork
 Steve Mann – mastering
 Andy Burgess – producer, arrangements
 Tino Troy – producer, arrangements

References

External sites
Official music videos

Praying Mantis (band) albums